Jović is a South Slavic surname, a patronymic of Jovan. It may refer to:

Aleksandar Jović (born 1972), retired Serbian international football player
Boban Jović (born 1991), Slovenian footballer
Bojan Jović (born 1982), Serbian football goalkeeper
Borisav Jović (1928–2021), Serbian communist politician, served as the Serbian member of the collective presidency of Yugoslavia
Božidar Jović (born 1972), Croatian handball player
Dejan Jović (born 1968), Croatian political scientist
Dragan Jović (born 1963), Bosnian football coach and the current manager of HŠK Zrinjski Mostar
Ivo Miro Jović (born 1950), the former Bosnian Croat member of the tripartite Presidency of Bosnia and Herzegovina
Josip Jović (1969–1991), Croatian police officer
Luka Jović (born 1997), Serbian footballer who plays for ACF Fiorentina
Milan Jović (born 1975), retired Serbian professional footballer
Milovan Jović (1955–2009), Serbian footballer
Mirko Jović (born 1959), the candidate for president of Serbia in the 2004 presidential election
Nikola Jović (born 2003), Serbian basketball player
Predrag Jović (born 1987), Serbian footballer
Stefan Jović (born 1990), Serbian basketball player

See also
Yovich
 Jovičić

Serbian surnames
Croatian surnames
Patronymic surnames
Surnames from given names